Pierre Vignaud (born 10 March 1983) is a former French professional footballer who played as a leftback most recently for the French club Quevilly in Championnat National, and who is currently a coach of Régional 1 side Grand-Quevilly.

Playing career
Vignaud begun his footballing training at the academy of AJ Auxerre, where he stayed for 10 years. He became a long-time player and legend for Rouen, and rejoined the club when it merged with US Quevilly-Rouen Vignaud made his professional debut for Quevilly in a 1-0 Coupe de la Ligue loss to US Orléans on 8 August 2017, at the age of 34. He made his Ligue 2 debut in a 4-1 loss to Football Bourg-en-Bresse Péronnas 01 on 11 August 2017.

After four years with Quevilly-Rouen, he signed for Régional 1 side Grand-Quevilly FC, where he made his debut in the fifth round of the Coupe de France against AS Tréport on 13 October 2019.

Coaching career
After becoming injured in November 2019, Vignaud was appointed as a coach of Grand-Quevilly in January 2020.

References

External links
 
 
 
 
 QRM Profile
 FC Rouen Profile

1983 births
Living people
Sportspeople from Côte-d'Or
French footballers
US Quevilly-Rouen Métropole players
Amiens SC players
FC Rouen players
Ligue 2 players
Championnat National players
Association football fullbacks
Association football defenders
Footballers from Bourgogne-Franche-Comté
Association football coaches
AJ Auxerre players